The Walton Correctional Institution  is a state prison for men located in DeFuniak Springs, Walton County, Florida, owned and operated by the Florida Department of Corrections.  This facility has a mix of security levels, including minimum, medium, and close, and houses adult male offenders.  Walton first opened in 1990 and has a maximum capacity of 1201 prisoners.

References

Prisons in Florida
Buildings and structures in Walton County, Florida
1990 establishments in Florida